The Hani or Ho people (Hani: Haqniq; ;  / 𠊛何贰) are a Lolo-speaking ethnic group in Southern China and Northern Laos and Vietnam. They form one of the 56 officially recognized nationalities of the People's Republic of China and one of the 54 officially recognized ethnic groups of Vietnam. In Laos, the Hani are more commonly known as Ho.

Distribution
There are 12,500 Hani living in Lai Châu Province and Lào Cai Province of Vietnam. The Ho reside in the mountainous northern regions of Phongsaly Province in Laos, near the Chinese and Vietnamese borders.

China
Over ninety percent of present-day Hani peoples live in the Province of Yunnan in Southern China, located across the Ailao Mountains, between the Mekong River and the Red River (Yuanjiang river).

Subdivisions of Hani autonomous counties within prefecture-level cities and a prefecture, within Yunnan are:
Mojiang Hani Autonomous County  — Pu'er City (prefecture-level city)
Jiangcheng Hani and Yi Autonomous County  —  Pu'er City
Ning'er Hani and Yi Autonomous County  —  Pu'er City
Yuanjiang Hani, Yi and Dai Autonomous County — Yuxi (prefecture-level city)
Zhenyuan Yi, Hani and Lahu Autonomous County  — Pu'er City
Honghe Hani and Yi Autonomous Prefecture

Origins
The origins of the Hani are not precisely known, though their ancestors, the ancient Qiang tribe, are believed to have migrated southward from the Qinghai–Tibetan plateau prior to the third century CE.

The Hani oral traditions state that they are descended from the Yi people, and that they split off as a separate tribe fifty generations ago. One of their oral traditions is the recital of the names of Hani ancestors from the first Hani family down to oneself.

Culture

Hani houses are usually two or three stories high, built with bamboo, mud, stone and wood.

The traditional clothing of the Hani is made with dark blue fabric. The men dress in short jackets and in long wide pants. They also wear white or black turbans. The women dress depending on which clan they belong to. There is no gender difference in the clothing of children under the age of seven.

Hani are known for their vocal polyphonic singing. Eight-part polyphony was recorded in the 1990s. They play traditional musical instruments,  end-blown flute labi (俄比). and three-stringed plucked lute lahe.

Terraced fields are a feature of their agricultural practices.

Religion 
The Hani are polytheists and they profess a special adoration toward the spirits of their ancestors. They are used to practicing rituals to venerate the different gods and thus to obtain their protection.

The religious hierarchy of the Hani is divided into three main personages: the zuima that directs the main celebrations; the beima, responsible for practicing the exorcisms and the magical rituals; the nima that takes charge of carrying out predictions and to administer the medicinal herbs. This last charge can be performed indistinctly by men and women.

Some Hani also practice Theravada Buddhism.

Language

The Hani language spoken by many of the Hani belongs to the Lolo-Burmese branch of the Sino-Tibetan language family. Many Hani speak languages related to Lolo-Burmese languages. Oral tradition tells of an ancient written script, tradition says it was lost on the migration from Sichuan. They now use a romanization of the Luchun dialect as a written script.

Subgroups

China
According to You Weiqiong (2013:159-160), Hani subgroups were classified as follows in 1954, with 11 primary branches. Respective locations (counties) are listed as well.
Hani 哈尼
Nuobi 糯比: in Xinping, Mojiang
Qidi 其弟/期弟: in Honghe, Mojiang, Puer, Zhenyuan, Sipsongpanna
Mahei 麻黑: in Puer, Jinggu, Zhenyuan
Luomian 罗勉: in Luquan, Wuding
Lami 腊米: in Zhenyuan, Mojiang, Honghe, Sipsongpanna
Kabie 卡别: in Mojiang
Duota 堕塔: in Puer, Xinping, Zhenyuan
Sanda 三达: in Sipsongpanna. The Sanda people live in Sanda Township 三达乡 (including in Dazhai 大寨) of Jinghong City, and speak a Yi language with many Hani loanwords (You 2013:136-137). There are 2 elderly women in Dazhai 大寨 who can only remember just over 40 words in the Sanda language. The Chinese name for this group is Sanda 三达, while the Dai name is Lanqian 兰千. The Sanda claim to have migrated from Yibang 倚邦 and Yiwu 易武. Initially, they were classified by the Chinese government as ethnic Yi, but currently they are classified as ethnic Hani.
Haini 海尼: in Jinggu
Huagu 花姑: in Yuanyang
Aka 阿卡: in Puer
Yeni 耶尼 (exonym: Kaduo 卡多): in Mojiang, Xinping, Puer, Zhenyuan, Jingdong, Jinggu, Sipsongpanna
Biyue 碧约: in Mojiang, Puer, Honghe, Xinping, Zhenyuan, Simao, Jinggu, Sipsongpanna, Jingdong
Haoni 豪尼
Budu 布都: in Mojiang, Puer, Honghe, Sipsongpanna, Zhenyuan, Jinggu, Simao, Xinping
Bujiao 补角: in Sipsongpanna
Baike 白壳: in Zhenyuan
Gecuo 哥搓 (exonym: Kucong 苦聪): in Zhenyuan, Xinping, Jinping, Mojiang, Puer, Honghe, Sipsongpanna, Yuanyang, Jinggu, Jingdong, Shuangbai
Axiluma 阿西鲁吗 (exonym: Ximoluo 西摩洛): in Mojiang, Puer, Honghe, Sipsongpanna, Zhenyuan, Jinggu, Simao, Jingdong
Duoni 多尼: in Yuanyang, Jinping
Amu 阿木: in Mojiang, Zhenyuan, Puer
Suoni 梭尼 (exonym: Asuo 阿梭): in Jinping
Luomei 罗美 (exonym: Suobi 梭比): in Xinping
Bukong 布孔 (exonyms: Heni 合尼, Baihong 白宏): in Mojiang, Honghe, Puer, Sipsongpanna, Zhenyuan, Jingdong

Vietnam
The Hani of Vietnam consist of the following subgroups (Vu 2010:10-11).

 The Flowery Hani (Hà Nhì Hoa), who are found in Lai Châu Province and are further split into two subgroups.
 Hà Nhì Cồ Chồ
 Hà Nhì La Mí
 The Black Hani, who are found in Bát Xát District, Lào Cai Province

In Vietnam, communes consisting almost exclusively of ethnic Hani include Sín Thầu, Chúng Chải, Mù Cả, Ka Lăng, Thu Lủm (all in Mường Tè District), Y Tý and A Lù (all in Bát Xát District). The Hani of A Lù had originally come from Jinping County of Yunnan, China, and had later spread from A Lù to the communes of Lao Chải, Nậm Pung, and Ngài Thầu.

See also
 Honghe Hani and Yi Autonomous Prefecture
 Yuanyang County, Yunnan, with its Hani majority and immense rice terraced mountains
 Akha people, a closely related people who have spread out from Yunnan province into Burma, Vietnam, Laos and Thailand. The Akha that still live in China are seen as part of the Hani people.
 Hanoish languages

References

External links 

Photographs of the Hani of Yuanyang County, Yunnan
Hani gallery
The Hani ethnic minority on China.org.cn (Chinese government site)
Asia harvest ethnic profile 
ハニ和辞典 (Hani-Japanese glossary)
UNESCO about terrace fields

 
Ethnic groups officially recognized by China
Ethnic groups in Laos
Ethnic groups in Vietnam
Ethnic groups in Yunnan

az:Xan (xalq)